Barbar is a village in the north of Bahrain. Situated in the Northern Governorate, it lies between the neighbouring villages of Diraz and Jannusan, along the Budaiya highway.

The Dilmun era Barbar Temple is in the village and is on the tentative list of UNESCO World Heritage Sites.

See also
 List of cities in Bahrain

References

Populated places in the Northern Governorate, Bahrain
Populated coastal places in Bahrain